Hwang Hui-yeol (born 27 July 1969) is a South Korean weightlifter. He competed in the men's featherweight event at the 1996 Summer Olympics.

References

External links
 

1969 births
Living people
South Korean male weightlifters
Olympic weightlifters of South Korea
Weightlifters at the 1996 Summer Olympics
Place of birth missing (living people)
20th-century South Korean people